Alexander Theodorowicz Batalin (13 August 1847 – 13 October 1896), alternatively known as Alexandr Fedorovich Batalin, was a Russian botanist. He was the Chief Botanist and Director of the Imperial Botanical Garden in St. Petersburg.

Legacy
The epithet batalinii is used to refer to Alexander Theodorowicz Batalin in a species name (e.g., Tulipa batalinii, Cattleya Batalinii ).

References

External links

1847 births
1896 deaths
19th-century botanists from the Russian Empire
Scientists from Saint Petersburg